ISP ("In-situ Partial Order") is a tool for the formal verification of MPI programs developed within the School of Computing at the University of Utah. Like model checkers, such as SPIN, ISP verifies the complete state space of a system for a set of safety properties. However, unlike model checkers, ISP performs code level verification. This means that the tool verifies all relevant interleavings of a concurrent program by replaying the actual program code without building verification models. This idea was pioneered in a number of tools, notably by Godefroid, in his VeriSoft tool.
Other recent tools of this genre include the Java Pathfinder, Microsoft's CHESS tool, and MODIST.
Relevant interleavings are computed using a customized dynamic partial order reduction algorithm called POE.

ISP has been used to successfully verify up to 14,000 lines of MPI/C code for deadlocks and assertion violations. It currently supports over 60 MPI 2.1 functions, and has been tested with MPICH2, OpenMPI, and Microsoft MPI libraries.

ISP is available for download for linux and Mac OS X; as a Visual Studio plugin for running under Windows, and as an Eclipse plugin..

References

Anh Vo, Sarvani Vakkalanka, Michael DeLisi, Ganesh Gopalakrishnan, Robert M. Kirby, and Rajeev Thakur, Formal Verification of Practical MPI Programs, PPoPP 2009

Sarvani Vakkalanka, Michael DeLisi, Ganesh Gopalakrishnan, and Robert M. Kirby, Scheduling Considerations for Building Dynamic Verification Tools for MPI, Parallel and Distributed Systems - Testing and Debugging (PADTAD-VI), Seattle, WA, July, 2008.

Sarvani Vakkalanka, Michael DeLisi, Ganesh Gopalakrishnan, Robert M. Kirby, Rajeev Thakur, and William Gropp, Implementing Efficient Dynamic Formal Verification Methods for MPI Programs, Recent Advances in Parallel Virtual Machine and Message Passing Interface (EuroPVM/MPI 2008), Dublin, Ireland, 2008, LNCS 5205, pp. 248–256.

Sarvani Vakkalanka, Subodh Sharma, Ganesh Gopalakrishnan, and Robert M. Kirby, ISP: A Tool for Model Checking MPI Programs, Principles and Practices of Parallel Programming (PPoPP 2008), Salt Lake City, February 2008, pp. 285–286.

Salman Pervez, Robert Palmer, Ganesh Gopalakrishnan, Robert M. Kirby, Rajeev Thakur, and William Gropp, Practical Model Checking Methods for Verifying Correctness of MPI Programs, Recent Advances in Parallel Virtual Machine and Message Passing Interface (PDF) (EuroPVM/MPI), Paris, 344—353, LNCS 4757, France, September 30 - October 3, 2007

Cited By
Combining symbolic execution with model checking to verify parallel numerical programs,umass.edu PDF 
SF Siegel, A Mironova, GS Avrunin, LA Clarke - ACM Transactions on Software Engineering and Methodology - portal.acm.org

Verification of halting properties for MPI programs using nonblocking operations
 - psu.edu PDF 
SF Siegel, GS Avrunin - Lecture Notes in Computer Science, 2007 - Springer

MPIWiz: Subgroup reproducible replay of MPI applications
R Xue, X Liu, M Wu, Z Guo, W Chen, W Zheng, Z Zhang, Geoffrey M. Voelker
Tsinghua University, Microsoft Research Asia, University of Southern California San Diego - cs.ucsd.edu

Dynamic testing of flow graph based parallel applications
 - epfl.ch  
B Schaeli, RD Hersch - Proceedings of the 6th workshop on Parallel and distributed Programming, 2008 - portal.acm.org

Visual Debugging of MPI Applications
 - epfl.ch PDF 
B Schaeli, A Al-Shabibi, RD Hersch - Proceedings of the 15th European PVM/MPI Users' Group …, 2008 - Springer

External links
 ISP-Release

Parallel computing
Application programming interfaces